Russell High School may refer to:

In Canada:

 Russell High School (Ontario) Russell, Ontario

In the South Africa:

 Russell High School (Pietermaritzburg) , Pietermaritzburg , KwaZulu-Natal

In the United States:

 Russell High School (Kansas) in Russell, Kansas: Russell County Unified School District 407
 Russell High School (Kentucky), physically located in Flatwoods, Kentucky, but with a postal address of Russell, Kentucky
 Russell High School (East Point, Georgia), a former high school in East Point, Georgia

See also

 Russell School (disambiguation)